Mudenda is a surename. It may refer to:

Elijah Mudenda (1927–2008), Zambian politician. Second Prime Minister of Zambia (1975-1977)
Jacob Mudenda, Zimbabwean politician, Speaker of the National Assembly of Zimbabwe
Kennedy Mudenda (born 1988), Zambian footballer
Mwaka Mudenda, presenter of Blue Peter UK TV series. See list
Zambian surnames
Tonga-language surnames
Zimbabwean surnames